Zapped is a 2014 Disney Channel Original Movie starring Zendaya, Chanelle Peloso, Emilia McCarthy and Spencer Boldman. Zendaya portrays the lead role, Zoey Stevens.

Plot
16 year old high-schooler Zoey Stevens is an average girl whose widowed mother just remarried. They move in with her new stepfather and three stepbrothers, Adam the oldest, Zach the middle child, and Ben the youngest. Zoey's stepbrother Adam is always in a rush due to being captain of the basketball team; Ben, is always getting dirty; Zach, has a habit of making disgusting food creations, and their father, Ted, is the basketball team coach.

After a disastrous first day at her new school, Zoey downloads an app that's original purpose was to control the family dog, but after her phone falls into dog food and skates down solar panels, she finds out the app has changed from being able to control her dog to controlling the men in her life. She first finds it freaky, but then realizes how much of an advantage she has and decides to use it as a personal tool.

Zoe uses the app to make things right in her school not forgetting her dance team. Her dance rival becomes suspicious of her while she notices her using the app during dance training. Zoe realizes that using the app against people's advantage isn't going to change anything and decides to quit using the app.

While at the washroom, her dance rival steals her phone without her noticing and uses it to make all the men on the basketball court respect and obey her commands. Zoe and her friend tracks down their dance rival and retrieves the phone from her. The film ends with Zoe fixing thing and, with the game beginning. After that, a dance competition is held and Zoey's team wins.

Cast
 Zendaya as Zoey Stevens, the central character of the film.
 Chanelle Peloso as Rachel, Zoey's best friend.
 Spencer Boldman as Jackson, Zoey's love interest and former boyfriend of Taylor's.
 Emilia McCarthy as Taylor, Zoey's rival, school diva.
 Adam DiMarco as Adam Thompson, Zoey's oldest stepbrother who plays basketball.
 Louriza Tronco as Yuki, Taylor's best friend.
 Lucia Walters as Jeannie Stevens, Zoey's mom. Adam, Zach & Ben's stepmom.
 Aleks Paunovic as Ted Thompson, Zoey's stepdad. Adam, Zach & Ben's dad.
 William Ainscough as Ben Thompson, Zoey's youngest step brother.
 Jedidiah Goodacre as Tripp
 Connor Cowie as Zach Thompson, Zoey's middle step brother.
 Samuel Patrick Chu as Charlie, Rachel's love interest.

Production
Zapped is produced by Off-Leash Teleproductions, Inc., distributed by Muse Distribution International and MarVista Entertainment and is licensed by ABC Cable Networks and Family Channel.

Broadcast
Zapped was released on demand and Watch Disney Channel on June 23, 2014. It made its debut on June 27, 2014 on Disney Channel in the United States, and Family Channel in Canada. Disney Channel (UK and Ireland) broadcast the film on July 18, 2014.

Reception
The premiere garnered 5.7 million viewers, making it the most-watched broadcast on cable that night. In the United Kingdom, it got 320,000 viewers including timeshift.

References

External links
 

2010s fantasy comedy films
2010s teen comedy films
2014 television films
2014 films
American fantasy comedy films
American teen comedy films
Canadian fantasy comedy films
Canadian teen comedy films
Disney Channel Original Movie films
English-language Canadian films
Films based on American novels
Films directed by Peter DeLuise
2010s English-language films
2010s Canadian films
2010s American films